
This is a timeline of British history, comprising important legal and territorial changes and political events in the United Kingdom and its predecessor states. To read about the background to these events, see History of England, History of Wales, History of Scotland, History of Ireland, History of the formation of the United Kingdom and History of the United Kingdom.

 Centuries: 1st BC1st2nd3rd4th5th6th7th8th9th10th11th12th13th14th15th16th17th18th19th20th21stRefs

1st century BC

1st century

2nd century

3rd century 
3rd Century Britain: Wikipage

4th century

5th century

6th century

7th century

8th century

9th century

10th century

11th century

12th century

13th century

14th century

15th century

16th century

17th century

18th century

19th century

20th century

21st century

See also 
 Timeline of Cornish history
 Timeline of English history
 Timeline of Irish history
 Timeline of Scottish history
 Timeline of Welsh history

References

Further reading

 Langer, William. An Encyclopedia of World History (5th ed. 1973); highly detailed outline of events online free

 Morris, Richard B. and Graham W. Irwin, eds. Harper Encyclopedia of the Modern World: A Concise Reference History from 1760 to the Present (1970) online

 
British